The Secret of the Well (French: Le puits mitoyen) is a 1914 French silent film directed by Maurice Tourneur.

Cast
 Henry Roussel 
 Renée Sylvaire
 Manzoni 
 Sohège

References

Bibliography
 Waldman, Harry. Maurice Tourneur: The Life and Films. McFarland, 2001.

External links

1914 films
Films directed by Maurice Tourneur
French silent short films
French black-and-white films
1910s French films